Harry Styles is the debut studio album by English singer and songwriter Harry Styles. The album was released on 12 May 2017, through Columbia Records and Erskine. For the album, Styles worked with producers Jeff Bhasker, Alex Salibian, Tyler Johnson and Kid Harpoon.

Lyrically, Harry Styles' themes is dominated by focus on women and relationships. The record has been described by various publications as influenced by music from the 1960s and 1970s, including classic rock and singer-songwriter ballads. It was preceded by the release of its lead single, "Sign of the Times", while "Two Ghosts" and "Kiwi" served as the second and third worldwide singles, respectively. In support of the album, Styles embarked on his first headlining concert tour, Harry Styles: Live on Tour.

The album received generally positive reviews from music critics and debuted atop the charts in several countries, including Australia, Canada, the UK and the US. It has been certified platinum in the UK, the US, Australia, Canada, Italy, Brazil, Denmark, Poland, and Mexico. According to the International Federation of the Phonographic Industry (IFPI), Harry Styles was the ninth global best-selling album of 2017 with sales of one million copies.

Background
In August 2015, One Direction announced that an extended hiatus would take place following the release of their fifth studio album. In January 2016, Us Weekly published a report claiming that the group's hiatus would, in fact, become a permanent split, noting that each of the four remaining group members did not renew their contracts following the completion of the On the Road Again Tour in October 2015. Representatives for the group denied the report in a statement to Billboard, stating, "nothing has changed regarding hiatus plans for the group, and all will be revealed in due time from the band members' own mouths."

In February 2016, it was confirmed that Styles had left the group's management, becoming the second member of the band to do so after Zayn Malik's departure almost a year prior. In June, it was confirmed that Styles had signed a recording contract with Columbia Records. 

Styles enlisted American producer Jeff Bhasker to executive produce the album. Most of the album is written by the two with Bhasker associates producers Tyler Johnson and Alex Salibian, engineer/bassist Ryan Nasci, and guitarist Mitch Rowland; Rowland was introduced by Nasci when a session musician dropped out. 

Additionally, One Direction producer John Ryan helped write "Two Ghosts" with Julian Bunetta and English singer-songwriter Kid Harpoon produced "Carolina" and "Sweet Creature". Johnson and Kid Harpoon would go on to produce much of Styles' second album Fine Line together.

Recording sessions for the album took place in a number of locations, including in Los Angeles, London, and the Gee Jam Hotel Recording Studio in Port Antonio, Jamaica, where Styles and his production team had a two-month writing retreat in the autumn of 2016. The album was primarily recorded at The Village in Los Angeles.

Promotion

On 31 March 2017, Styles announced the album's lead single to be "Sign of the Times", which was released on 7 April. The album name, artwork, and track list were revealed on 13 April. The album track "Sweet Creature" was released as a promotional single on 2 May. Styles performed the songs "Sign of the Times" and "Ever Since New York" on 15 April episode of Saturday Night Live. On 21 April, Styles appeared on The Graham Norton Show for his first televised solo performance in his native country, and guested on the French talk show, Quotidien, five days later; he performed "Sign of the Times" on both shows.

On 9 May, Styles performed the tracks "Carolina", "Sign of the Times", "Ever Since New York", and a cover of One Direction's "Stockholm Syndrome" on The Today Show. On 13 May, a day after the album's release, he held a surprise concert at The Garage in London. Styles held a similar show at the Troubadour in Los Angeles on 19 May, and invited Fleetwood Mac's Stevie Nicks to perform as a special guest. Proceeds from both shows were donated to charity. On 15 May, Harry Styles: Behind the Album was released exclusively on Apple Music, a 49-minute documentary film showing footage from his writing and recording sessions in Jamaica and Los Angeles; The Performances version features a full-length live performance of the album filmed at London's Abbey Road Studios. Styles was the musical guest on The Late Late Show with James Corden every night in the week spanning from 15 to 18 May, and performed in various sketches alongside Corden. In support of the album, Styles embarked on his first solo tour, Harry Styles: Live on Tour, which ran from September 2017 through to July 2018 and visited North America, Europe, Asia, Oceania, and South America. On tour, Styles debuted two unreleased songs, "Oh Anna" and "Medicine", which were originally written for the album.

Music and themes

Music publications have described the album as soft rock, rock, Britpop, and pop. Critics noted influences by British classic rock and singer-songwriter folk. Varietys Eve Barlow described the album as a "cocktail of psychedelia, Britpop, and balladry", while for Jon Caramanica of The New York Times it "is steeped in the singer-songwriter music of the late 1960s and 1970s, and in moments, in the flamboyant harder rock of the late 1970s and 1980s." Lyrically, the album's themes mostly focus on women and relationships. In a Rolling Stone interview with Cameron Crowe, Styles said "The one subject that hits the hardest is love, whether it’s platonic, romantic, loving it, gaining it, losing it...it always hits you hardest."

The album opens with a soft music number, "Meet Me in the Hallway", a psychedelic pop ballad performed with twanging guitars. "Sign of the Times" is pop rock, soft rock, "apocalyptic" ballad which musically encapsulates Styles' aspirations. The vaguely Caribbean groover track "Carolina" recalls Blur's Britpop style; described by Styles as "the little bit of fun we had been wanting but didn't have" while making the album. "Two Ghosts" is a country influenced soft rock ballad about former lovers. Lullaby-like folk acoustic ballad "Sweet Creature" discusses the strength of a bond that endures despite bad times. The uptempo song "Only Angel" veers towards glam rock. In rock song "Kiwi" he sings about a classic femme fatale. A slower track, the rock troubadour "Ever Since New York", features lyrics about meditation on loss and longing. "Woman" has elements of funk rock, in which Styles compares his jealousy to a howling beast. The acoustic closer track, "From The Dining Table", features lush, multi-part harmonies, and recalls the confessional style of the album's opener.

Critical reception

At Metacritic, which assigns a normalised rating out of 100 to reviews from mainstream publications, the album has an average score of 68 based on 24 reviews, indicating "generally favorable reviews". AllMusic critic Tim Sendra opined that the album works "exceedingly well" as a modern pop record and an extension of the sound and brand of One Direction, but "as the kind of personal statement Styles wants to make, it comes very close, but ultimately falls just short." For Jason Lipshutz of Billboard, Styles "has opted to forego radio play and make a big, brash guitar album", arguing, "his commitment to conjuring the spirit of '70s rock never comes across as overreaching." Rolling Stones Rob Sheffield states that Styles "claims his turf as a true rock & roll prince" on his "superb solo debut". Mikael Wood of Los Angeles Times wrote Styles "never overplays his hand on this winningly relaxed collection", but found the "dad-baiting" album to be "full of echoes of The Beatles, Pink Floyd and The Rolling Stones." MusicOMHs John Murphy commented that even though it occasionally "dips into bland pastiche", the album is a "fine solo effort", which "as the latest step in rebranding Styles for a brand new audience, it will do just fine". Annie Zaleski of The A.V. Club felt Styles took a "bold step forward by leaning on the past", adding, "hopefully the songs will someday catch up to his ambition". Rick Pearson of Evening Standard called it "a self-consciously serious and grown-up effort".

Alexis Petridis of The Guardian stated that while "Styles is remarkably good as a confessional singer-songwriter [...] not all the album's musical homages work". Jon Caramanica of The New York Times felt the "sometimes great, sometimes foggy" album is "almost bold in its resistance to contemporary pop music aesthetics." David Sakllah of Consequence of Sound wrote "the missteps don't detract too much from this ambitious, if slightly unfocused, debut", as "he's certainly on the right track". Mesfin Fekadu of Associated Press noted the performance aspect of the album is where Styles "truly shines", but "not so much" in the creative process. Anjali Raguraman of The Straits Times called "Sign of the Times" the "strongest" track on the album and felt Styles sounds "most self-assured on the slower numbers", while noting that "his inexperience shows when he falls into tired tropes". Regarding the use of tropes, Roisin O'Connor of The Independent was disappointed that Styles did not "break away from some of the more fatigued gender archetypes that dominate the rock music he clearly loves." Shahzaib Hussain of Clash contended that Styles "[created] an immersive, reference-fuelled tribute to classic rock for the millennial generation", albeit "[offering] little in the way of innovation". However, Hussain singles out "Only Angel" and "Kiwi" for being "misfires", calling the tracks "a one-two punch of masochistic, rock swaggering, admirable in its legerdemain, [that] ultimately comes undone by haphazard lyricism." In a negative review, Dave Hanratty of Drowned in Sound felt that Styles "failed to make a defining statement", writing that the album "from start to finish [...] is a series of impressions" of Elton John, Beck, Mick Jagger, and The Beatles.

Neil McCormick of The Daily Telegraph wrote that, compared to the other One Direction member's solo careers, Styles' is "more eccentric but more appealing, with an endearing quality of relish in its musical adventures", calling the album "so old-fashioned it may actually come across as something new to its target audience" and "perfectly lovely and about as substantial as ripples on the surface of a Beverly Hills swimming pool". Leah Greenblaat of Entertainment Weekly named Styles "a man proudly looking backward, a faithful revivalist steeped in the tao of dusty vinyl and dad rock" while noting that he "basks in the privilege of paying tribute to his many musical heroes, and trying on all the styles that fit". Leonie Cooper of NME described the album as "a not-that-bad-actually mish-mash of Los Angeles' style classic rock and ballads", commenting that fans will be "over the moon with this collection of radio-friendly rockers and heartstring tugging balladry" and "everyone else" will be "pleasantly surprised – if not a little taken aback at just how many tricks he’s pinched from other artists". She ends the review by opining that "taking inspiration from the best seems to have paid dividends, but it doesn’t half make you wonder what the real Harry Styles sounds like". Jamieson Cox of Pitchfork wrote that the record "pays fine tribute to classic rock’n’roll and shows off his exceptional voice, if not his enigmatic persona", opining that his "vocal performances are invariably the best parts of these songs" while particuraly praising the album's last track, "From the Dining Table", writing that "it’s intoxicating, and it ends Harry Styles on the most promising possible note".

Year-end lists

Commercial performance
The album debuted atop the UK Albums Chart with first-week sales of 57,000 units, with Styles becoming the second One Direction member to achieve a number one solo album, following Zayn's Mind of Mine in April 2016. It debuted at number one on the US Billboard 200 with 230,000 album-equivalent units, of which 193,000 were pure album sales. It is the highest first sales week for a British male artist's debut full-length album since Nielsen SoundScan began in 1991. Selling 67,000 units in its second week, it fell down to number three.

The album was ranked number 22 on the list of the top 40 biggest albums of 2017 on the UK Album Chart. It was the fourth best selling album by a British artist worldwide in 2017. According to IFPI, it was the ninth best selling album of 2017, with 1 million copies shipped globally. The album was Sony Music's biggest global seller in the second quarter of 2017. It was the sixth best selling album of 2017 in Mexico.

"Sign of the Times" reached number one on the UK Singles Chart. In the US, the song debuted at number four on the Billboard Hot 100 The second single, "Two Ghosts", peaked at number 58 on the UK Singles Chart and number 34 on the US Mainstream Top 40 charts.

Track listing

Notes
 "Only Angel" contains a sample of dialogue from the film Barfly.

Personnel
Credits adapted from the liner notes of Harry Styles.

Performers and musicians

Harry Styles – vocals, background vocals, claps , guitar , omnichord 
Steve Aho – orchestrator / conductor / musician contractor 
Erik Arvinder – violin 
Jeffrey Azoff – background vocals , claps 
Kala Balch – alto vocals 
Laurhan Beato – alto vocals 
Jeff Bhasker – background vocals , claps , keys , lap steel , moog , piano 
Edie Lehmann Boddicker – gospel choirmaster , alto 
Johnny Britt – tenor vocals 
Reid Bruton – bass-baritone vocals 
Caroline Buckman – viola 
Charlean Carmon – soprano vocals 
Carmen Carter – soprano vocals 
Alvin Chea – bass-baritone vocals 
Monique Donnelly – soprano vocals 
Allie Feder – soprano vocals 
Vanessa Freebairn-Smith – cello 
Jim Gilstrap – bass-baritone vocals 
Ira Glansbeek – cello 
Taylor Graves – tenor vocals 
Kid Harpoon – background vocals , bass , claps , guitar 
Clydene Jackson – alto vocals 
Tyler Johnson – background vocals , claps , keys , piano 
Keri Larson – soprano vocals 
Songa Lee – violin 
David Loucks – tenor vocals 
Jamie McCrary – tenor vocals 
Ryan Nasci – bass , lap steel 
Diane Reynolds – soprano vocals 
Mitch Rowland – acoustic guitar , background vocals , claps , cowbell , electric guitar , guitar , drums 
Alex Salibian – acoustic guitar , background vocals , claps , keys , piano 
Aretha Scruggs – alto vocals 
Fletcher Sheridan – tenor vocals 
Katie Sloan – violin 
Carmen Twillie – tenor vocals 
Ina Veli – violin 
Julia Waters – soprano vocals 
Oren Waters – tenor vocals 
Will Wheaton – bass-baritone vocals 
Michael Whitson – viola 
Baraka Williams – alto vocals 
Eyvonne Williams – alto vocals

Production

Jeff Bhasker – executive production, production , additional production 
Matt Dyson – assistant engineering
Chris Gehringer – mastering
Kid Harpoon – production , engineering 
Tyler Johnson – production , co-production , additional production , programming 
Ryan Nasci – engineering, mixing 
Alex Salibian – production , co-production , additional production 
Mark "Spike" Stent – mixing

Design

Calvin Aurand – specialty packaging photography
Jacob Hassett – graphic design
Molly Hawkins – creative director
Harley Weir – photography

Charts

Weekly charts

Monthly charts

Year-end charts

Certifications

See also
 List of Billboard 200 number-one albums of 2017
 List of number-one albums of 2017 (Australia)
 List of number-one albums of 2017 (Belgium)
 List of number-one albums of 2017 (Ireland)
 List of number-one albums of 2017 (Poland)
 List of number-one albums of 2017 (Spain)
 List of UK Albums Chart number ones of the 2010s

Notes

References

2017 debut albums
Britpop albums
Columbia Records albums
Harry Styles albums
Albums produced by Jeff Bhasker